Under the Radar Volume 2 is a compilation album by English singer Robbie Williams, comprising demos, B-sides and rarities. It was released exclusively through Williams' website on 30 November 2017.

On 11 July 2017, Williams had announced that the follow up to his 2014 album, Under the Radar Volume 2, would be released in November of that year and was available to pre-order from his official website.

Track listing

References

2017 compilation albums
Robbie Williams albums